Club Sport Marítimo Feminino is a Portuguese women's football team from Funchal, Madeira. They are the women's section of Club Sport Marítimo and currently compete in the top-level Campeonato Nacional Feminino after being promoted in 2018 by winning the Campeonato Nacional II Divisão Feminino.

Players

Current squad

Honours
Campeonato Nacional II Divisão Feminino
Winners: 2018

Season statistics

 Last updated: 11 March 2021
 Division = Division; Pos = Position in League; Pld = Played; W = Won; D = Drawn; L = Lost; GF = Goals for; GA = Goals against; Pts = Points
 R5 = Fifth round R4 = Fourth round; R3 = Third round; R2 = Second round; R1 = First round; PO = Play-off; GS = Group stage; R64 = Round of 64; R32 = Round of 32; R16 = Round of 16; QF = Quarter-finals; SF = Semi-finals; RU = Runners-up; W = Winners

References

External links
  
 Profile on zerozero.pt 

C.S. Marítimo
Marítimo
Marítimo
Marítimo
Marítimo
Marítimo
Marítimo